Tibouchina verticillaris is a species of flowering plant in the family Melastomataceae, native to Brazil. It was first described by Alfred Cogniaux in 1885.

References

verticillaris
Flora of Brazil
Plants described in 1885
Taxa named by Alfred Cogniaux